Julie Farr, M.D. ( Having Babies) is an American medical drama series that aired on ABC from March 14, 1978 until June 26, 1979. It followed three television movies called Having Babies which aired from 1976 to 1978, and was not renewed after its initial run of episodes aired in March–April 1978.  The show began airing as Having Babies but was renamed Julie Farr, M.D. during its run after its lead character.

Background
A series of three movie specials called Having Babies (II and III for the latter installments) aired on ABC from 1976 to 1978.  Following the airing of Having Babies III as the ABC Friday Night Movie on March 3, 1978, the storyline was continued as a six-episode "trial" one-hour series on Tuesday nights.

As of March 28, 1978, the show began airing under the title of Julie Farr, M.D., apparently to try to attract more male viewers.  After the initial episode run was completed on April 18, 1978, the show was not renewed, though three unaired episodes were later shown in June 1979.

The show was the first American hospital drama that centered on a female character, and its failure caused some concern in Hollywood that such a show could not succeed, even though the poor quality of the story lines and fairly poor reviews of the show likely also played a part.

Plot
The show starred Susan Sullivan as Dr. Julie Farr, a role which debuted in the Having Babies II movie.

Reception
Initial reviews of the show, as it transitioned from its movie-status to a series, were somewhat negative.  One review opined that Sullivan "plays a better than average medico," but that the show was "one of the finer comedies of the season," which was a rather big problem since the show was a drama.   The National PTA, however, ranked it number 7 among the top 10 shows on television.  Sullivan was also nominated for an Emmy for her performance.

The ratings for the series were far from stellar.  Though the March 7, 1978 debut ranked 26th, the final episode tied for 60th place out of 68 prime time shows.

Cast
Susan Sullivan as Dr. Julie Farr
Dennis Howard as Dr. Ron Danvers
Mitchell Ryan as Dr. Blake Simmons
Beverly Todd as Kelly

Episodes

References

External links
 

1978 American television series debuts
1979 American television series endings
1970s American drama television series
1970s American medical television series
American Broadcasting Company original programming
English-language television shows
Television shows set in Los Angeles
Television series by CBS Studios